Temoh is a small town in the Batang Padang District of Perak, Malaysia. The town is located midway between Kampar and Tapah.

This town is named after the Temu River which later became a junction between the two rivers. When the British came to the place for place naming, they accidentally called it as "Temoh".

Batang Padang District
Towns in Perak